Himu or Himaloy is a fictional character created by the Bangladeshi writer Humayun Ahmed who appears in a disjunct series of novels. The character first appeared in the novel titled Mayurakkhi published in 1990.

Character
The real name of the character is Himalay, a name given by his father. He follows a lifestyle that was instructed by his psychopathic father who wanted him to be a great man.

Himu wears a yellow panjabi that does not have a pocket and lives a mostly nomadic life. He walks barefoot on the streets of Dhaka without a certain destination. He does not have a job and, therefore, no source of income. He prefers the life of a beggar to that of a hard worker, often praising begging. However, Himu walks endlessly – never using any form of transportation. The charterer is decidedly eccentric and unorthodox in outlook.

He has a large number of followers for his spiritual power of predicting future events of anyone, including those of police officers, beggars, neighbors, relatives, and tea stall proprietors. Most of the time he indifferently speaks unpleasant truth about the person with whom he talks.

Himu unlike the atheist  psychology Professor Misir Ali argues that the beliefs make things happen, not inspecting or asking questions. This aspect of him makes him a person who lives by the magical side of the world, not using logic.

There are 21 novels about Himu.
Five others are Himu-based.

Bibliography

 ময়ূরাক্ষী: 
 দরজার ওপাশে: 
 হিমু: 
 পারাপার: 
 এবং হিমু ...: 
 হিমুর হাতে কয়েকটি নীলপদ্ম: 
 হিমুর দ্বিতীয় প্রহর:  - a crossover with Misir Ali
 হিমুর রূপালী রাত্রি: 
 একজন হিমু কয়েকটি ঝিঁ ঝিঁ পোকা: 
 তোমাদের এই নগরে: 
 চলে যায় বসন্তের দিন: 
 সে আসে ধীরে: 
 আঙুল কাটা জগলু: 
 হলুদ হিমু কালো র‍্যাব: 
 আজ হিমুর বিয়ে: 
 হিমু রিমান্ডে: 
 হিমুর মধ্যদুপুর: 
 হিমুর নীল জোছনা: 
 হিমুর আছে জল: 
 হিমু এবং একটি রাশিয়ান পরী: 
 হিমু এবং হার্ভার্ড Ph.D. বল্টুভাই:

Other Himu-related books
 হিমু মামা: 
 হিমুর একান্ত সাক্ষাৎকার ও অন্যান্য: 
 হিমুর বাবার কথামালা: 
 ময়ূরাক্ষীর তীরে: 
 আজ রবিবার: Aaj Robibar (Today's Sunday)

Filmography

Aaj Robibar (1996)
Himu (1994)

See also
 Misir Ali, Bengali character created by Humayun Ahmed
 Shuvro, Bengali character created by Humayun Ahmed
 Baker Bhai, Bengali character created by Humayun Ahmed
 Tuni,  Bengali character created by Humayun Ahmed.
 Tara Tin Jon, Bengali characters created by Humayun Ahmed appearing in a series of dramas, portrayed by Dr.Ejajul Islam, Faruque Ahmed and Shadhin Khosru.
 Alauddiner Cherager Doitto, Bengali character created by Humayun Ahmed appearing in a series of dramas, portrayed by Jayanta Chattopadhyay.

References 

Characters created by Humayun Ahmed
Fictional Bangladeshi people
Male characters in literature